The George Conner House, located off U.S. Route 150 in Fredericktown, Kentucky, was listed on the National Register of Historic Places in 1989.	

It is a Greek Revival-style five-bay two-story brick house built in 1842 with a two-story pedimented portico, one of only two L-shaped historic houses of its era in Washington County.

References

Houses on the National Register of Historic Places in Kentucky
Greek Revival houses in Kentucky
Houses completed in 1842
National Register of Historic Places in Washington County, Kentucky
Houses in Washington County, Kentucky
1842 establishments in Kentucky